Philip Matthew Donnelly (March 6, 1891 – September 12, 1961) was an American politician serving as the 41st and 43rd Governor of Missouri. He was a Democrat. Donnelly and Christopher S. "Kit" Bond are the only Missouri governors to serve two non-consecutive terms.

Personal history

Donnelly was born in Lebanon, Missouri in 1891, the son of Phil and Margaret (Halloran) Donnelly. Following his graduation from Lebanon High School in 1909 Donnelly attended St. Louis University, earning a law degree in 1913. Donnelly returned to his native Lebanon and entered private practice with J.W. Farris. In 1915 he wed Miss Juanita McFadden. They had one child, a son David, who himself became an attorney and joined his father's law practice.

Political history
Soon after his passing of the Missouri Bar and return to Lebanon Donnelly expressed an interest in politics. His first office was that of Lebanon city attorney, followed by election to one term as Laclede County prosecutor. Phil Donnelly entered state politics in 1922 by being elected State Representative for the Laclede County area. After one term in the House he was elected to Missouri State Senate in 1924 and remained there for the next twenty years. Senator Donnelly became Governor Donnelly for the first time after winning the 1944 gubernatorial race.

Highlights of his first term as governor included overseeing the implementation of a new Missouri state constitution in 1946, creation of the Missouri Department of Revenue, and welcoming international statesman Winston Churchill to Fulton, Missouri for the famous Iron Curtain speech at Westminster College. Missouri law prohibited someone from serving two consecutive terms as governor, so Donnelly was ineligible to run again in 1948. However he ran for governor again in 1952 and won easily. Following his second term, a first in Missouri history, he semi-retired to a law practice in Lebanon with his son. Phil M. Donnelly died September 12, 1961 and is buried in the Lebanon, Missouri city cemetery.

Honors
Honorary Doctor of Law degrees were bestowed on Governor Donnelly by Washington University in 1949 Westminster College, and William Jewell College.
Donnelly Elementary School in Lebanon, Missouri is named for the late Governor.
Donnelly Hall, formerly a residence hall (1961–2004) at University of Missouri was named in honor of the governor.

References

1891 births
1961 deaths
People from Lebanon, Missouri
Democratic Party governors of Missouri
Missouri lawyers
Saint Louis University alumni
20th-century American politicians
20th-century American lawyers